The Millennium Technology Prize is one of the world's largest technology prizes. It is awarded once every two years by Technology Academy Finland, an independent foundation established by Finnish industries, academic institutions, and the state of Finland. The patron of the prize is the President of Finland. The Millennium Technology Prize is Finland's tribute to innovations for a better life. The aims of the prize are to promote technological research and Finland as a high-tech Nordic welfare state. The prize was inaugurated in 2004.

The Prize
The idea of the prize came originally from the Finnish academician Pekka Jauho, with American real estate investor and philanthropist Arthur J Collingsworth encouraging its establishment. The Prize celebrates innovations that have a favorable and sustainable impact on quality of life and well-being of people. The innovations also must have been applied in practice and stimulate further research and development. Compared to the Nobel Prize the Millennium Technology Prize is a technology award, whereas the Nobel Prize is a science award. Furthermore, the Nobel Prize is awarded for basic research, but the Millennium Technology Prize may be given to a recently conceived innovation which is still being developed. The Millennium Technology Prize is not intended as a reward for lifetime achievement.

The Millennium Technology Prize is awarded by Technology Academy Finland (formerly Millennium Prize Foundation and Finnish Technology Award Foundation), established in 2002 by eight Finnish organisations supporting technological development and innovation. The prize sum is 1 million euros (~US$1.3 million). The Millennium Technology Prize is awarded every second year and its patron is the president of Finland. 

Universities, research institutes, national scientific and engineering academies, high-tech companies, and other organizations around the world are eligible to nominate individuals or groups for the award. Nominations are accepted from any field except military technology. In accordance with the rules of the Technology Academy Finland, a proposal concerning the winner of the Millennium Technology Prize is made to the board of the foundation by the eight-member international selection committee, and the final decision on the prize winner is made by the board of the foundation.

International Selection Committee (ISC)
Current members of the selection committee include:

Päivi Törmä, Professor at Aalto University and Chairman of ISC
Hans-Joachim Freund, Director at the Fritz Haber Institute of the Max Planck Society (Germany)
Sir Peter Knight, Retire Deputy Rector (Research) at Imperial College London
Jonathan Knowles, chairman of the board at Immunocore Ltd.
Sirpa Jalkanen, Professor of Immunology at University of Turku
Tero Ojanperä. Chairman of Silo.AI company
Cecilia Tortajada, Senior research at School of Public Policy, NUS

Past committee members include:
Jarl-Thure Eriksson, Chancellor of Åbo Akademi University and former Rector of Tampere University of Technology (Finland)
Eva-Mari Aro, Professor in Molecular Plant Biology at University of Turku (Finland)
Jaakko Astola, Professor of Signal Processing at Tampere University of Technology (Finland)
Craig R. Barrett, Retired CEO/Chairman of the Board of Intel Corporation (United States)
Riitta Hari, Director of both the multidisciplinary Brain Research Unit of the Low Temperature Laboratory at Aalto University and the national Centre of Excellence on Systems Neuroscience and Neuroimaging Research (Finland)
Konrad Osterwalder, Former Rector of the United Nations University and Under-Secretary-General of the United Nations (Switzerland)
Ayao Tsuge, President of the Japan Federation of Engineering Society and President of Japan International Science and Technology Exchange Center (Japan)

Laureates

*The ceremony was postponed due to the COVID-19 pandemic, and was held on 18 May, 2021.

See also
Harvey Prize
Japan Prize
Kyoto Prize
Nevanlinna Prize
Nobel Prize
Schock Prize
Shaw Prize
Tang Prize
ACM Turing Award
IET Faraday Medal
IEEE Medal of Honor
Queen Elizabeth Prize for Engineering
 List of engineering awards

References

External links
The Millennium Technology Prize - Official site
The Millennium Technology Prize Youtube Channel
Technology Academy Finland - Official site

International awards
Invention awards
Science and technology awards
Science and technology in Finland